The Douglass Center, formerly Douglas High School is a historic site in Live Oak, Florida where a high school for African Americans was established. The high school closed in 1969. In 2018 a historical marker was unveiled at the site. In the 1950s, students from the school performed at the Florida Folklife Festival in White Springs, Florida.

References

External links
Alumni site at Gluseum

Defunct high schools in the United States
Historical markers in the United States